Rhabdoscelus is a genus of beetles belonging to the family Curculionidae.

The species of this genus are found in Australia.

Species:

Rhabdoscelus interstitialis 
Rhabdoscelus obscurus 
Rhabdoscelus similis

References

Curculionidae